is a railway station on the Sanriku Railway Company’s Rias Line located in the village of Tanohata, Iwate Prefecture, Japan. The station was destroyed by the 2011 Tōhoku earthquake and tsunami and subsequently rebuilt at a new location.

Lines
Shimanokoshi Station is served by the  Rias Line, and is located 125.6 rail kilometers from the terminus of the line at Sakari Station.

Station layout 
Shimanokoshi Station had a single side platform serving a single bi-directional track, located on an embankment.

Adjacent stations

History 
Shimanokoshi Station opened on 1 April 1984, the same day of the privatization of the Japan National Railway (JNR) Kuji Line (which became the Sanriku Railway Company). During the 11 March 2011 Tōhoku earthquake and tsunami, much of the surrounding area was destroyed by a  tsunami, which also swept away the station building, and parts of the tracks and suspending services on a portion of the Sanriku Railway. The portion of the line from Rikuchū-Noda to Tanohata resumed operations on 1 April 2012., and services were extended to Omoto on 6 April 2014. The new station building was constructed approximately 100 meters north of the original station, on higher ground.。The new station building was officially opened on 27 July 2014.
Minami-Rias Line, a portion of Yamada Line, and Kita-Rias Line constitute Rias Line on 23 March 2019. Accordingly, this station became an intermediate station of Rias Line.

Surrounding area 
 Shimanokoshi Post Office

See also
 List of railway stations in Japan

References

External links

  

Railway stations in Iwate Prefecture
Railway stations in Japan opened in 1984
Rias Line
Tanohata, Iwate